Shamba may refer to:
 Sergei Shamba (born 1951), Abkhazian politician
Shamba, alternate name of Shonbeh, a city in Iran
Samba (Krishna's son)